Coquese Makebra Washington (born January 17, 1971) is a former collegiate and professional basketball player and former associate head coach at Notre Dame. She is currently the head basketball coach for the Rutgers University Scarlet Knights women's basketball team.  Washington holds a law degree and was the first president of the WNBA Players Association, holding that position from 1999 to 2001. She played high school basketball at Flint Central High School and collegiate basketball at the University of Notre Dame.

High school
Washington attended high school at Flint Central High School in Flint, Michigan. She was the starting point guard for all four years of her high school basketball career, the first player at Central to earn a starting position in all four years. Washington earned all-state honors in back to back years.  In her senior year she scored 373 points to set a school scoring record for a single season, And went on to score a total of 1,123 points in her career. She led the team to their first ever Saginaw Valley Conference and district championships. In addition to sports excellence, she also had musical talents, playing seven different musical instruments while at Central.

University of Notre Dame 

Washington played for Notre Dame's Fighting Irish women's basketball team from 1989 to 1993.  Afterwards, she attended Notre Dame Law School from 1994 to 1997, earning her J.D.

Professional playing career 
After completing her athletic eligibility with the Irish in 1993, she began a professional career by joining the American Basketball League 1996-98 (ABL). She began her pro career in 1997–98 as the starting point guard with the ABL's Portland Power.

Women's National Basketball Association Career
1998–99 – New York Liberty – Washington averaged 4.1 minutes, 0.6 points, and 0.8 rebounds per game.
2000 – Houston Comets: Washington received playing time in 25 games, and throughout the season, she averaged 1.7 points and an assist per game.
2001 – Houston Comets: Washington started all 32 games, as a point guard. Throughout the season, she averaged 5.3 points, 3.8 assists, 3.7 rebounds, and 2.16 steals per game. On August 3, 2001, playing against Orlando and in her best game of the season, she posted ten points, nine rebounds, and six assists.

Coaching career

Notre Dame
Washington began her coaching career in 1999, when she returned to her alma mater, University of Notre Dame, and worked as an assistant coach under Head Coach Muffet McGraw. She was part of the coaching staff for the team that won the NCAA Women's Division I Basketball Championship in 2001, defeating Purdue.

In August 2005, Washington was promoted to an Associate Head Coach, which includes the responsibility of coordinating Notre Dame's recruiting efforts on promising young players.

Penn State
On April 23, 2007, she was named the fifth coach in Penn State women's basketball history, following Rene Portland's resignation.

Washington increased her number of Big Ten wins in each of her first six years, starting with 4 conference wins in 2007–2008 and growing to 14 and her second consecutive Big Ten regular season title in the 2012–2013 campaign. Washington's first post season appearance at Penn State was a first round loss in the 2010 WNIT Tournament. Since 2011, Washington has led her teams to three consecutive NCAA Women's Division I Basketball Championship appearances where her teams have advanced past the first round in every appearance. Her most successful season was the 2011–2012 season when Washington's Lady Lions advanced to the Sweet Sixteen before losing to perennial powerhouse UConn.

In 2013, Coquese Washington was named to the 18-member "Presidential Search and Screen Committee" at Penn State to help determine the university's next President.

On March 8, 2019, Penn State and Washington parted ways after 12 seasons.

Oklahoma
On April 18, 2019, Washington was announced as the new associate head coach of the Oklahoma women's basketball program.

Rutgers
On May 23, 2022, Washington was announced as the new head coach of the Rutgers women's basketball program.

Awards and honors

 2007–08 WBCA "Rising Star" Award Winner
 2009 Greater Flint Hall of Fame Inductee
 2010–11 Black Coaches & Administrators Female Coach of the Year
 2011–12 Big Ten Coach of the Year
 2011–12 WBCA Region 6 Coach of the Year
 2011–12 WBCA National Coach of the Year Finalist
 2012–13 Big Ten Coach of the Year
 2012–13 WBCA Region 6 Coach of the Year
 2012–13 WBCA National Coach of the Year Finalist
 2012–13 Black Coaches & Administrators Female Coach of the Year
 2013–14 Big Ten Coach of the Year

Head coaching record

Personal
Washington lives in Somerset, Nj with her husband, Raynell Brown, and their son, Quenton Kassius Winston Brown (b. April 24, 2005), and daughter, Rhaiyna Kamille Brown (b. July 23, 2009). She has a mother, Velma Washington, and her father James Washington. (d. 2013) She has two sisters, Stephanie and India, and two brothers, Ameer and Kenyatta (d. 2016). She is close friends with Notre Dame coach Carol Owens and head coach Niele Ivey. Washington currently has no pets, and there is no other information known about her personal life.

References

External links 
Penn State coaching profile
Notre Dame coaching profile
WNBA Player Profile

1971 births
Living people
African-American basketball coaches
African-American basketball players
American women's basketball players
American women's basketball coaches
Basketball coaches from Michigan
Basketball players from Flint, Michigan
Flint Central High School alumni
Houston Comets players
Indiana Fever players
New York Liberty players
Notre Dame Fighting Irish women's basketball coaches
Notre Dame Fighting Irish women's basketball players
Oklahoma Sooners women's basketball coaches
Penn State Lady Lions basketball coaches
Point guards
Portland Power players
Sportspeople from Flint, Michigan
21st-century African-American sportspeople
21st-century African-American women
20th-century African-American sportspeople
20th-century African-American women